Mandelker is a surname. Notable people with the surname include:

Daniel R. Mandelker, American legal scholar
Sigal Mandelker (born 1971), American lawyer

See also
Mandelkern